The Taylor School District is headquartered the city of Taylor in Greater Detroit in the U.S. state of Michigan. The district serves Taylor and portions of Brownstown, Dearborn Heights, Inkster, and Westland. As of 2014 it is the largest governmental unit in the Downriver area and the fifth-largest school district in Wayne County.

History

As of Summer 2013, the Inkster Public Schools District was entirely dissolved. The Taylor school district absorbed some of the Inkster boundary. Students south of Michigan and east of Middlebelt were rezoned to Taylor.

Staff demographics
As of 2014 the district has 596 full-time faculty and 148 support staff. The former includes 14 district administrators and 22 school administrators and the latter includes 62 teacher's aides.

Schools

Taylor School District Preschool
Eureka Heights Elementary School - Eureka Heights Elementary School Official Website
Holland Elementary School - Holland Elementary School Official Website
Lyndon B. Johnson Early Childhood (Preschool) (formerly Johnson Elementary School)
Kinyon Elementary School - Kinyon Elementary School Official Website
Berniece McDowell Elementary School - McDowell Elementary School Official Website
Blair Moody Elementary School - Moody Elementary School Official Website
William J. Myers Elementary School - Myers Elementary School Official Website
Clarence Randall Elementary School - Randall Elementary School Official Website
Taylor Parks Elementary School - Taylor Parks Elementary School Official Website
Taylor School District Secondary Schools
J. Edgar Hoover Middle School - Hoover Middle School Official Website
Robert J. West Middle School - West Middle School Official Website
Taylor High School - Taylor High School Official Website
James I. Maley Taylor Career & Technical Center - Taylor Career Center Official Website

Former 

Bartlett Elementary School (Taylor, formerly Racho #2) closed June 2007. Now Green space.
Edgewood Elementary School (Taylor) - This school was razed & replaced by housing development.
Edison Elementary School (Taylor) - This school was razed & replaced by a condominium complex, which has been torn down.
Eurekadale Elementary School - The Taylor Head Start Program currently occupies the building.
Federal Elementary School (Dearborn Heights) - Now the Faith Covenant Church International.
Fred C. Fischer Elementary School (Taylor) - Closed June 2011— currently used by the Taylor Schools Utility Dept. and for storage.
Fletcher Elementary School
Johnson Elementary School (Taylor) - Renamed Johnson Preschool Center Closed 2009, then preschool was temporarily relocated back to Johnson after a fire in the preschool wing of Clarence Randall.  Building was again closed in 2010. Reopened in 2015 as Johnson Early Childhood Center.
Monroe Elementary School (Taylor) - Building was razed. Used as green space. 
Pine Elementary School (Taylor) - Now the Taylor School District Utility/Maintenance Department.
Racho Elementary School #1 (Taylor) - This building has been razed.
Sand Hill Elementary School
The Sixth Grade Academy - Closed June 2016 - Sixth graders merged into the middle schools
Taylor Center Elementary School - This building has been razed.
Treadwell Elementary School (Taylor) - Closed June 2006—now the King of Kings Christian Center.
Wareing Elementary School (Taylor, formerly Fairlane Elementary School) - currently used as a police K9 dog training facility.
Williams Elementary School - Now the William D. Ford Senior Citizens Activity Center.
Brake Junior High School - The Sixth Grade Academy later occupied the building.
Taylor Junior High School (Taylor) - Some district services and Career Center now use the building.
Truman Junior High School - Converted to Truman High School.
 Taylor Center High School (Taylor) - Closed in 1997—roughly half of the school was razed some time later, with the remaining portions seeing unknown use until being fully razed in 2011.  The property is now used for greenspace.
John F. Kennedy High School - Closed in 2018
Harry S Truman High School - Consolidated with Kennedy High School to become Taylor High School in 2018.
TITAN Academy Alternative Education - moved to Truman High School for 1 year. Last year in Truman High School 2016.

References

External links 

 Taylor School District Official Website

Education in Wayne County, Michigan
School districts in Michigan
Taylor, Michigan
Dearborn Heights, Michigan
Inkster, Michigan
Westland, Michigan